Gheysiyeh (also Romanized as Gheys̄īyeh; also known as Gheysheh and Nahr-e Gheys̄īyeh) is a village in Jazireh-ye Minu Rural District, Minu District, Khorramshahr County, Khuzestan Province, Iran. At the 2006 census, its population was 214, in 38 families.

References 

Populated places in Khorramshahr County